Dysprosium(III) fluoride is an inorganic compound of dysprosium with a chemical formula DyF3.

Production 
It can be produced by mixing dysprosium(III) chloride or dysprosium(III) carbonate into 40% hydrofluoric acid.

DyCl3 + 3 HF → DyF3 + 3 HCl
Dy2(CO3)3 + 6 HF → 2 DyF3 + 3 H2O + 3 CO2

References

Fluorides
Dysprosium compounds
Lanthanide halides